Carhartt, Inc. is an American apparel company founded in 1889, known for heavy-duty working clothes such as jackets, coats, overalls, coveralls, vests, shirts, jeans, dungarees, fire-resistant clothing and hunting apparel. Carhartt remains a family-owned company, owned by the descendants of founder Hamilton Carhartt, with its headquarters in Dearborn, Michigan.

Founding and history
Carhartt was founded by Hamilton Carhartt in 1889 in Detroit, Michigan, to make work clothing for manual laborers. The company started with two sewing machines and five workers. Carhartt's first slogan was "Honest value for an honest dollar." The company's initial expansion in the 1890s focused on railroad workers' need for strong and long-lasting work clothes. Carhartt worked closely with local railroad workers to ensure that his work bibs met their needs. Within 20 years of its founding, Carhartt had expanded its facilities into eight other cities, including locations in the United Kingdom and Canada. Carhartt downsized due to declining sales during the Great Depression, but experienced a resurgence in World War II.

Over the years, Carhartt clothing items evolved trademark features intended to extend durability, including the use of heavy-duty thread, reinforcing rivets at stress points, and a variety of durable, high technology materials resistant to flame, abrasion, stains, and water. Today, Carhartt clothing is commonly found on construction sites, farms and ranches, among other job sites.

Carhartt had total sales of $92 million in 1990. As of 1992, Carhartt sold more than two million jackets per year. As of 2013, Carhartt had sales of about $600 million per year.

Products

Carhartt is renowned for its full-cut, wind-resistant, snag-proof, heavy-duty work jackets which are popular with construction workers, miners, farmers, hunters, and outdoors people. Carhartt has also successfully expanded its appeal to general street wear. Carhartt jackets are plain and manufactured in muted colors such as mustard, khaki and navy blue. They are usually waist-length or three-quarter length. Most are made from relatively stiff 12-ounce cotton canvas with triple-stitched seams. Carhartt also makes pants and overalls with colors and materials that match its jackets. Carhartt jackets are not designed for unusually tall or slender men; they are typically cut wide around the middle to accommodate hefty men.

In 2007, the company launched the Carhartt for Women line of women's workwear for the fall season.

Collaborations
Collaborations from 2013 also include lines from Adam Kimmel × Carhartt, as well as collections through the A.P.C. × Carhartt line. Both collections used fashion designers, Adam Kimmel and Jean Touitou.

In 2014, Carhartt launched a craft beer in cooperation with Michigan brewery New Holland Brewing (The Carhartt Woodsman).

Work in Progress (WIP)

Swiss couple Edwin and Salomée Faeh, designers specializing in denim, discussed representing Carhartt in Europe when they visited the United States in 1989 (the centenary of the company's founding). They started by selling Carhartt's authentic workwear. In 1994, they were granted a license to create their own lines of clothing under the name Carhartt Work in Progress (WIP). WIP is the streetwear version of the Carhartt brand, often marketed as comparable to Stüssy or Supreme.

Carhartt WIP often collaborates with other streetwear brands. An example would be the line of A Bathing Ape X Carhartt WIP camouflage hoodies and jackets. There have also been collaborations with A.P.C., Comme des Garçons, Vetements, Junya Watanabe Pontus Alv's Polar Skate Co, and Gosha Rubchinskiy and Tolya Titaev's skatebrand PACCBET. The WIP founders strategy was to immerse themselves in sub-cultures that interested them and pursue marketing activities that existed in them. This included graffiti, fanzines, skateboarding, hip hop, and a BMX cycle team. Carhartt WIP have a number of stores in Europe (including Berlin, London, Barcelona and Madrid), Asia, Australia and also in the U.S. (New York City and Los Angeles).

In the London riots of August 2011, the Carhartt WIP outlet store in Hackney in North of the city was looted as thousands of pounds worth of stock was stolen. The brand released a T-shirt with a photo of their storefront mid-looting.

Operations and corporate affairs

Carhartt is still a privately held, family-owned company, owned by the descendants of founder Hamilton Carhartt.

Carhartt owns and operates its manufacturing base in Mexico as well as a number of unionized factories and distribution centers in the United States. Carhartt offers a "Union-Made in USA" line of workwear through its retailers. The company has four factories in the United States. The firm also makes an effort to use domestic suppliers: in 2015, Carhartt purchased 19.5 million pounds of cotton from Georgia, 32 million buttons made in Kentucky and 1 million drawcords from Kentucky.

The manufacturing of many of Carhartt's non-core apparel items have been outsourced to countries including China and Mexico. Carhartt requires its international suppliers to be Worldwide Responsible Accredited Production (WRAP) certified.

As of 2003, Carhartt operated four factories in two Mexican states employing about 2,000 workers. In 1997, Carhartt built a plant in Pénjamo, state of Guanajuato, Mexico, and in December 2001 they opened a second plant about 30 miles away, in the city of Irapuato. In 2003, Carhartt purchased two additional facilities from the Labor Board of the state of Durango in an auction. All of Carhartt's Mexican plants have WRAP certification. In 2003 Carhartt opened another plant in Penjamo, which used to be the old Lee building.

Carhartt EMEA (Europe, Middle East and Africa) was formed in 2006 to provide workwear to the European market (WIP).

Sales and advertising
Large regional farm stores like Blain's Farm & Fleet, Fleet Farm and Tractor Supply Company are among the company's most important retailers. Carhartt itself operates retail stores in the U.S. Uniquely, it celebrates the opening of its stores with a sledgehammer smashing a wall instead of a traditional ribbon-cutting ceremony. The company operates a "flagship" store in downtown Detroit in the old Cass Motor Sales building.

Carhartt keeps most of its advertising work in-house, a rare arrangement for a firm its size. Its ads feature actual consumers on actual work sites. In the past Carhartt focused on advertisements in magazines such as Popular Mechanics and American Cowboy with slogans like "As Rugged As The Men Who Wear Them." More recently the company has updated its style and has even partnered with actor Jason Momoa to make ads on things like surfing, hunting as a family tradition, and women making donuts while wearing suspenders.

In popular culture

Tommy Boy Records used Carhartt jackets as a promotional vehicle and had its logo embroidered on them. Tommy Boy initially gave away 800 such jackets to "tastemakers and people seen in all the right places." This effort was so successful that the record label eventually started expanding into clothing. Carhartt is now popular with hip-hoppers. In the New York hip-hop scene mustard brown and hunter green Carhartts are favored. Rappers like Tupac and Dre wore Carhartt. Carhartt jackets and their evolution as fashion items were featured prominently at the Bronx Museum of the Arts exhibition entitled "One Planet Under a Groove: Hip-Hop and Contemporary Art" in 2002.

Carhartt has become a part of the local culture in Alaska. The city of Talkeetna holds an annual "Carhartt Ball." The Alaska State Fair hosts a Carhartt fashion show. Carhartt capitalized on the growth of the working class in Alaska in the late 20th century due to the growth of the oil industry by having its local sales representative, Doug Tweedie, carefully cultivate relationships with the independent stores that dominate the state's relatively isolated retail market. In 2001, per capita sales of the brand's products were higher in Alaska than anywhere else in the world.

The main characters of Interstellar wear Carhartt jackets. Carhartt products were on screen for about one hour. Matthew McConaughey wore the Duck Detroit Jacket #J001. Jessica Chastain wore the Weathered Duck Quinwood Chore Coat.

Liam Neeson wore a Carhartt jacket in Before and After.

The titular character in the Netflix series Marvel's Luke Cage is often seen wearing Carhartt apparel throughout the series. His signature "bulletridden hoodie" is a customized version of the Carhartt Rain Defender Rutland hooded sweatshirt.

Carhartt is popular with politicians trying to connect with blue-collar voters. John Fetterman, Sarah Palin, Rick Perry, and Barack Obama have all been seen prominently wearing Carhartt clothing.

The television series Yellowstone prominently features Carhartt clothing.

Sponsorships and philanthropy
In the United States, Carhartt sponsors blue-collar organizations and events such as the National FFA Organization, and rodeos. The company is also a vocal supporter of organized labor. Carhartt sponsors work training programs such as Helmets to Hardhats. Carhartt is also one of the main sponsors of the Detroit Jazz Festival and the Bassmaster College Series.

During the 9/11 World Trade Center rescue operations, the Carhartt company donated thousands of bib overalls to the rescue crew to be used on scene.

On April 6, 2020, Carhartt shifted U.S. production to protective masks and medical gowns in response to the COVID-19 crisis. The manufactured outcome would include 50,000 medical gowns and 2.5 million protective masks.

Carhartt sponsored the #17 Ford Taurus, and Ford Fusion car for Roush Fenway Racing who was driven by Matt Kenseth. While the sponsorship only lasted from 2003 to 2009, it was rarely a sponsor on the car, rarely features any special type of paint scheme. Carhartt, though, displayed a Carhartt for Women paint scheme for the 2007 Bank of America 500 at Charlotte.

References

External links

 
 Carhartt Europe 
 Carhartt "Work in Progress"
 Carhartt Streetwear
 Carhartt History

1889 establishments in Michigan
2010s fashion
Clothing brands of the United States
Clothing companies established in 1889
Companies based in Wayne County, Michigan
Dearborn, Michigan
Working-class culture in the United States
Workwear
Family-owned companies of the United States